The New York Age was a weekly newspaper established in 1887. It was widely considered one of the most prominent African-American newspapers of its time.

History

Origins 
The New York Age newspaper was founded as the weekly New York Globe (not to be confused with New York's Saturday family weekly, The Globe, founded 1892 by James M. Place or the daily The New York Globe founded in 1904), an African-American newspaper that was published weekly from at least 1880 to November 8, 1884. It was co-founded by editor Timothy Thomas Fortune,  a former slave.

1884–1887 
The newspaper became the [New York] Freeman from November 22, 1884, to October 8, 1887, published six times weekly. It was co-owned by Jerome B. Peterson, who in 1904 was made the American consul in Puerto Cabello, Venezuela.

1887–1960 
On October 15, 1887, the newspaper officially became the weekly New York Age. Fred R. Moore bought the paper in 1907. From 1953 to 1957, it was titled the New York Age Defender.

Gertrude Bustill Mossell worked at the New York Age from 1885 to 1889. W. E. B. Du Bois also worked there.

The 1974 Reawakening of the African-American weekly 
The New York Age, a firebrand fighter of racial injustice that died in the nineteen fifties, its zeal spent, was born again with its demeanor changed but its aim primarily the same. Adam C. Powell, the executive editor of the weekly newspaper, said that the paper would attempt to regain the eminence of the old Age, which was known during its heyday as the “distinguished black newspaper of opinion.” The initial press run of the paper in 1974 was 100,000 copies and it was sold at newsstands for 25 cents.

Personnel 
 Lester Walton (1882–1965), theater critic; he was a son-in-law of the publisher, Fred A. Moore
 Ludlow "Buster" Werner (né Ludlow Waymouth Werner; 1907–1967) became managing editor in 1929; he was a grandson of Fred Moore
 William A. Clarke, sports editor
 Chester R. Thompson, editor of the Brooklyn section
 Vere Johns contributed a column on The Arts
 James H. Hogans wrote news of railroad men and church doings
 Richard Durant, music critic
 Lewis E. Dial, sports
 Ebenzer Ray, special columns
 Bertram Baker, special columns
 Olive Arnold Adams

References

External links 
 New York Age at Chronicling America
 New York Age at 

Newspapers published in New York City
African-American newspapers
Publications established in 1887
Publications disestablished in 1960
1887 establishments in New York (state)
1960 disestablishments in New York (state)
African-American newspapers published in New York (state)